The 2022 Oceania Athletics Championships, the sixteenth edition of the Oceania Athletics Championships, are currently being held in Mackay, North Queensland from June 7–9, 2022.

Originally scheduled for 2021 in Port Vila, Vanuatu, on February 16, 2021, Oceania Athletics announced that the event would not be conducted due to the COVID-19 pandemic. It was later announced that the championships would be rescheduled and relocated to a new venue in 2022.

Timetable

Participating teams

  
  (Host)
 / Northern Australia as "Regional Australia"

Medal table

Event summary
Complete results can be found on the Oceania Athletics Association webpage.

Men

Track events

Field events

Multi-events

Women

Track events

Field events

Multi-events

References

2022
2022 in Australian sport
June 2022 sports events in Australia
2022 in athletics (track and field)